This article is about the particular significance of the year 1835 to Wales and its people.

Incumbents
Lord Lieutenant of Anglesey – Henry Paget, 1st Marquess of Anglesey 
Lord Lieutenant of Brecknockshire – Henry Somerset, 6th Duke of Beaufort (until 23 November); Penry Williams (from 24 December)
Lord Lieutenant of Caernarvonshire – Peter Drummond-Burrell, 22nd Baron Willoughby de Eresby 
Lord Lieutenant of Cardiganshire – William Edward Powell
Lord Lieutenant of Carmarthenshire – George Rice, 3rd Baron Dynevor 
Lord Lieutenant of Denbighshire – Sir Watkin Williams-Wynn, 5th Baronet    
Lord Lieutenant of Flintshire – Robert Grosvenor, 1st Marquess of Westminster 
Lord Lieutenant of Glamorgan – John Crichton-Stuart, 2nd Marquess of Bute 
Lord Lieutenant of Merionethshire – Sir Watkin Williams-Wynn, 5th Baronet
Lord Lieutenant of Monmouthshire – Henry Somerset, 6th Duke of Beaufort (until 23 November); Capel Hanbury Leigh (from 24 December
Lord Lieutenant of Montgomeryshire – Edward Herbert, 2nd Earl of Powis
Lord Lieutenant of Pembrokeshire – Sir John Owen, 1st Baronet
Lord Lieutenant of Radnorshire – George Rodney, 3rd Baron Rodney

Bishop of Bangor – Christopher Bethell 
Bishop of Llandaff – Edward Copleston 
Bishop of St Asaph – William Carey 
Bishop of St Davids – John Jenkinson

Events
8 January - Sir Joseph Bailey is elected MP for Worcester.
19 February - In the United Kingdom general election, newly elected MPs in Wales include Wilson Jones at Denbigh Boroughs.
March - At a public meeting in the King's Head Inn, Newport, plans for a floating dock are agreed.
July - The Newport Dock Act receives the royal assent.
September - John Frost is one of the first councillors elected in Newport under the terms of the Municipal Reform Act.
1 December - John Owen, mayor of Newport, cuts the first sod as construction begins on Newport Docks.
date unknown
The steam whistle, invented by Adrian Stephens two years earlier, is seen in operation at Dowlais ironworks and is adopted by the Liverpool and Manchester Railway shortly afterwards.
Adam Sedgwick names the Cambrian period in geology.

Arts and literature
 The Royal Institution of South Wales is established as the Swansea Philosophical and Literary Society.

New books
Y Fwyalchen (poetry anthology)
Edward Herbert, 2nd Earl of Powis - The Lyvys of the Seyntys

Music
Anglesey Musical Society holds its first festival.
John Roberts (Alaw Elwy) plays the harp for Queen Adelaide at Winchester.

Births
5 April (in Trowbridge) – Solomon Andrews, entrepreneur (d. 1908)
10 May – John Jenkins, 1st Baron Glantawe, industrialist (d. 1913)
14 July – John Roberts, politician (d. 1894)
7 August – Griffith Evans, bacteriologist (d. 1935)
29 August – Ivor Guest, 1st Baron Wimborne (d. 1914)

Deaths
3 March – Daniel Evans, Independent minister and author, 61
1 May – Edward Jones, architect, 39
13 May – John Nash, architect, 83
16 May – Felicia Hemans, poet, 41
4 June – William Owen Pughe, grammarian and lexicographer, 75
23 November – Henry Somerset, 6th Duke of Beaufort, Lord Lieutenant of Brecknockshire and Monmouthshire, 68
1 December – Robert Davies (Robin Ddu o'r Glyn), poet, 66
16 December – David Price, East India Company officer, 73
29 December – Richard Llwyd, poet, 83

References

Wales